A Ne'er-do-well is a good-for-nothing person.

Ne'er-do-well may also refer to:
 The Ne'er-do-Weel, an 1878 play by W. S. Gilbert, revived soon afterwards as The Vagabond
 The Ne'er-Do-Well, a 1911 novel by Rex Beach, adapted for film several times in the silent era
 The Ne'er-Do-Well (1916 film), a 1916 American silent adventure crime drama film

 The Ne'er-Do-Well, a 1923 silent film directed by Alfred E. Green

 Ne'er-Do-Well, a 1956 novel by Dornford Yates

 Ne'er Do Wells, a rock band